The QuikTrip Corporation, more commonly known as QuikTrip (QT), is an American chain of convenience stores based in Tulsa, Oklahoma that primarily operates in the Midwestern, Southern, and Southeastern United States as well as in Arizona. QuikTrip is one of two convenience store chains based in Oklahoma (the other being Love's).

The first QuikTrip was opened in 1958 in Tulsa by Burt Holmes and Chester Cadieux. The company expanded outside of Oklahoma in 1968, and started selling gasoline in 1971. Chester's son, Chet, Jr., is the current CEO.

In 2005, QuikTrip and Chevron were the first two retailers to earn a "Top Tier" rating from General Motors, BMW, Honda, Volkswagen, Audi, and Toyota. The "Top Tier" rating exceeds the United States Environmental Protection Agency's standards for gasoline additives.

QuikTrip was ranked as one of the 100 Best Companies to Work For. In January 2006, QT ranked No. 21, ninth among companies classified as "mid-size". In 2008, QT was ranked No. 27 on Fortune'''s Top 100 list. QuikTrip often uses this fact in recruiting new employees. QuikTrip also ranked No. 33 on Forbes magazine's list of largest private companies in 2016.

History
While driving through Dallas, Burt Holmes was intrigued by the success of 7-Eleven and decided to open a small grocery store in his hometown of Tulsa. He took on classmate Chester Cadieux as a partner in his planned venture. Holmes and Cadieux each invested $5,000, and three other investors put up $2,000 each for the venture.

The first QuikTrip store was opened in a Tulsa strip mall in 1958, which sold a limited selection of groceries with high prices for the convenience. The chain grew rapidly, opening its first store outside Tulsa in 1964, expanding to Missouri in 1968 and Iowa in 1974.

QuikTrip began to sell gasoline in 1971 as states legalized self-service stations. In the early 1970s, co-founder Cadieux eliminated slow-moving merchandise from the stores' inventory, such as canned vegetables, and stocked a larger quantity of items, priced low for high-volume sales, such as beer, soda, coffee, cigarettes, and candy. In 1976, it became one of the first convenience store chains to be open 24 hours a day. Also that year, it adopted its now-famous "QT" logo.

QuikTrip had its own branded goods marketed from the 1970s to the 1980s, including QT Beer—QT for "Quittin' Time". The ad campaign, "It's QT Time Again", would often show a dog named Lamar. The dog's owner was portrayed in television commercials by actor Ben Jones, who often asked the dog, "Ain't that right, Lamar?"

In 1987, Cadieux was the first inductee into the Convenience Store Hall of Fame and was noted for being the first to offer self serve fountain drinks, the first to design and offer a fast food module, the first to open a downtown convenience store, and the first to install personal computers in the stores and tie them to the company's mainframe.

In 1988, upon rapid expansions into the St. Louis and Atlanta markets, QuikTrip began a renovation of all stores, primarily replacing the earthtone exterior and interior with a bright red color scheme. The interior decor featured red countertops and a red quarry tile floor; almond tile on the walls interspersed with painted red sections of the walls to create contrast. Some gold trim maintained continuity from the previous decor. The company also took more care with landscaping around the store. By the early 1990s, QuikTrip began to offer fast foods and fountain beverages at its stores, being the first convenience store to offer a self-serve soda fountain and a self-serve coffee bar. Expensive advertising led the company to phase out the private label beer by this time.

In 1994, QuikTrip acquired the former Memorex/Telex Communications headquarters in Tulsa and remodeled part of the building for its Oklahoma division. In 2003, QuikTrip decided to consolidate all employees into one corporate campus in south Tulsa and sold the building to Community Care College.

In 2017, QuikTrip announced plans to expand into two additional markets in Texas, San Antonio and Austin. The first San Antonio store opened in October 2018, with three more locations opening in the following months.

Products and services

In an attempt to increase speed and improve customer service at checkout, QuikTrip asks customers to stand at the counter versus standing in a long line. Employees are taught at orientation to go provide assistance on an additional register when the customer to cashier ratio exceeds 3:1, and to direct customers to the closest available checkout.

Since the early 1990s, QuikTrip has sold a private label brand of fast food, "Quick 'n Tasty" and "HOTZI sandwiches". "Quick 'n Tasty" heat-and-serve sandwiches include Texas Ham and Cheese, BarBQ Pork Rib, and the Super Po Boy. "HOTZI" breakfast sandwiches included the sausage, egg, and cheese biscuit and the breakfast burrito.

In 2012, QuikTrip began an initiative of offering fresh food made daily at its own bakery and commissary referred to as QT Kitchens. The products includes fresh sandwiches, wraps, salads, fruit, and various pastries made and delivered daily. Since then, QuikTrip has expanded the "QT Kitchens" brand to include actual kitchens in their stores with made-to-order hot food as well as specialty drinks. The company also retrofitted their older style stores to include the new kitchen operations, in addition to building entirely new "Gen 3" stores. These stores feature multiple entrances, a common floor-plan (coffee and tea, baked goods, grocery items and liquor in one wing; fountain sodas, hot dogs, chips and bottled non-alcoholic drinks in the other; and a deli case with sandwiches and candy in the middle) and are centered around the QT Kitchens counter, which provides made-to-order food as well as a grab-and-go selection of breakfast sandwiches in the morning and pizza slices in the afternoon and evening.

Travel centers
During rapid expansion in the late 1980s, some QuikTrip stores included large 'travel centers.' A smaller version of a truck stop, the travel centers included a 5,000-square-foot store, 12 gasoline pumps, five diesel pumps with an elevated canopy to accommodate large trucks, a truck scale, and a store to serve the needs of truck drivers.

Dual-branded stores
In 1994, QuikTrip began test-marketing a dual-brand concept in St. Louis, Kansas City, Springfield, and Atlanta, where a 3,000-square-foot Wendy's store was attached to each QuikTrip convenience store. In Des Moines, QuikTrip opened a new store with a Burger King with a separate entry and a drive-through window, but a passageway allowing movement between the convenience store and the restaurant.

Non-traditional stores
In October 2007, QuikTrip opened a store within the T-Mobile Center in Kansas City, Missouri.  The location only offered concessions and not gasoline. The store was closed in mid-2013. The company's second store without gasoline—store No.1700— opened in midtown Atlanta at the Viewpoint Midtown condominium building on Peachtree Street.

In 2008, QuikTrip signed an agreement with the city of Grand Prairie, Texas for naming rights to the Grand Prairie AirHogs' new stadium, to be named QuikTrip Park. The deal included a QuikTrip booth at the stadium selling QT Kitchens products at the park for store price.

Locations
QuikTrip operates over 800 stores, which are located in the following areas of the United States:
Alabama: Tuscaloosa & Auburn metro (2 Stores)
Arizona: Phoenix metro (102 stores)
Arizona: Tucson metro (20 stores)
Arkansas: Little Rock metro (2 stores)
Colorado: Denver metro (2 stores)
Georgia: Atlanta metro (139 stores)
Iowa: Des Moines metro (33 stores)
Kansas: Wichita metro (39 stores)
Kansas / Missouri: Kansas City metro (89 stores)
Louisiana: Shreveport metro (2 stores)
Missouri / Illinois: St. Louis metro (75 stores)
Nebraska / Iowa: Omaha metro (16 stores)
North Carolina / South Carolina: Charlotte metro (48 stores)
Oklahoma: Tulsa metro (82 stores)
 Remote Store Network: Joplin, Missouri, Lindale, Texas, Waco, Texas (3 stores)
South Carolina: Greenville / Spartanburg metro (27 Stores)
South Carolina: Columbia metro (3 stores)
Tennessee: Nashville metro (4 stores)
Tennessee: Chattanooga (1 store)
Texas: Dallas / Fort Worth metro (155 stores)
Texas: Austin, Texas / San Antonio, Texas metro (46 stores)
Texas: Abilene, Texas (1 store)
Texas: Conroe, Texas (1 store) I-45 northbound at Wilson Road exit opened January 2022.

All stores are owned and operated by the company.

In the Atlanta and Dallas/Fort Worth metro areas, QuikTrip competes head to head with RaceTrac, an Atlanta-based convenience store chain that is very similar to QuikTrip inside and out. Both chains tend to have new clean facilities with abundant on-site lighting and a large convenience area. In many cases, the two competitors are located directly across the street or on opposite street corners from one another.  In 2017, QuikTrip began expansion into the Austin and San Antonio metro areas, in direct competition with another similar rival, Buc-ee's.
QuikTrip entered the Abilene, Texas market on June 3, 2021, with a travel center at Old Anson Road and Interstate 20.

Because the company operates stores in Iowa and Illinois, and retains the trademarks to the name within those states, competing chain Kwik Trip uses a different name for their stores in those states, Kwik Star.

QuikTrip has 102 locations in the Phoenix metropolitan area, but none located within the city limits of suburban Scottsdale. This is due to a city ordinance that regulates the design and build of gas and service stations within city limits. Neither the city nor the company will give in to the other (QuikTrip will not build a station conforming to the ordinance and Scottsdale will not make an exception for QuikTrip), therefore Scottsdale is the only city in the Phoenix area without a QuikTrip.

The company has run into similar issues in Overland Park, Kansas, but it is more from a desire to make the city more "pedestrian-friendly".

References

External links
 
 
 Reifman, Shlomo; Murphy, Andrea D. (November 6, 2008). "# 32 QuikTrip". "America's Largest Private Companies". Forbes''.
Voices of Oklahoma interview with Chester Cadieux. First person interview conducted on July 31, 2009, with Chester Cadieux, co-founder of QuikTrip.
Voices of Oklahoma interview with Burt B. Holmes. First person interview conducted on May 28, 2014, with Burt B. Holmes, co-founder of QuikTrip. See Chapter 9 titled "QuikTrip."

Companies based in Tulsa, Oklahoma
Privately held companies based in Oklahoma
Privately held companies of the United States
Economy of the Midwestern United States
Economy of the Southeastern United States
Economy of the Southwestern United States
Convenience stores of the United States
Gas stations in the United States
1958 establishments in Oklahoma
American companies established in 1958
Retail companies established in 1958
Family-owned companies of the United States